Alena Marx  (born 21 December 2000) is a Swiss slalom canoeist who has competed at the international level since 2016.

Career
She was selected to represent Switzerland in the C1 event at the delayed 2020 Summer Olympics in Tokyo. She finished in 19th place after being eliminated in the semifinal.

Personal life
Her brother Dimitri Marx also competes in canoe slalom and is a two-time U23 world champion in Extreme slalom.

References

External links

2000 births
Living people
Swiss female canoeists
Olympic canoeists of Switzerland
Canoeists at the 2020 Summer Olympics